Italy national under-20 football team is the national under-20 football team of Italy and is controlled by the Italian Football Federation.

The team competes for the FIFA U-20 World Cup, which is held every two years.

History
The Under-20 team is the de facto Under-19 of the previous year, and it acts mainly as a feeder team for the U21s providing further international development for youth players.

The team competes for its only official tournament, the FIFA U-20 World Cup, depending on the U19s results at the UEFA European Under-19 Championship held in the even-numbered years, that qualifies European teams for the U-20 World Cup. So far, the best result of the team is just third place in 2017. Italy managed to qualify for two consecutive U-20 World Cup for the first time, after topping the group in 2018 UEFA European Under-19 Championship.

Each season the team mainly participates in friendly tournaments, in which overage players may also be selected. The U20 team participated until 2017 in the annual Four Nations Tournament with Germany, Switzerland and Poland (which replaced Austria). Since the 2017–18 season, the Italy U20 team participates in the annual Under 20 Elite League, expanded to 8 participants.

The team also had an annual fixture with the Serie D Best XI after the end of the season.  (except 2009, which the U-20 (B team) was coined "U-19 team" and coached by U-19 coach Massimo Piscedda, which the A team went to Mediterranean Games).The 2006 edition was also played by the de facto U20 team but coached by U19 coach Paolo Berrettini. The 2011 edition was played by Italy Universiade team.

FIFA U-20 World Cup record 

*Draws includes knockout matches decided on penalty shootouts.

Current squad 
The following players were called up for the 2022–23 Under 20 Elite League matches against Norway and Germany on 23 and 27 March 2023 respectively.

See also
 Italy national under-21 football team
 Italy national under-19 football team
 FIFA U-20 World Cup

References

References
 Official website, Italian language
 Official website, English language

European national under-20 association football teams
Under-20
Youth football in Italy